Business France is a French Government agency created on 1 January 2015 through a merger between UBIFRANCE and the French Agency for International Investment (InvestInFrance).

It has the status of a public institution, as well as of an industrial and commercial character under the supervision of the Ministry of Economy and Finance, the Ministry of Foreign Affairs and International Development and the Ministry of Rural Spatial Planning and Development Territory.

Business France's Chairman is Pascal Cagni and Director General is Laurent Saint-Martin.

Business France work is divided into four main pillars:

 Promote French exports. 
 Promote inward investments to France. 
 Enable international internships in French companies abroad, also open to candidates from the European Economic Area. This is done via an international internship called VIE, which stands for” Volontariat International en Entreprises”). 
 Promote the image of France as a business country.

Priority is given to small innovative companies.

Business France has a cooperation agreement with 13 regional agencies.

History
Ubifrance was the French agency for export promotion. It succeeded the "Centre Français du commerce extérieur"(French Center for external commerce), or CFCE.

Its headquarters is on Boulevard Saint-Jacques, 14th arrondissement of Paris, but it is also based in the World Trade Center of Grenoble.

UBIFrance has 66 economic missions in 46 countries and more than 1,400 employees in France and abroad responsible for helping French companies in their international development.  France's budget bill for 2011 authorized €105,398,000 for the agency.

On 1 January 2015, UBIFRANCE merged with InvestInFrance and became Business France.

Governance

Board of directors 
The agency is run by a sixteen members board composed of:

 1 National Assembly député
 1 senator
 3 government representatives
 3 regional council members
 5 economic experts
 3 staff representatives

References

External links
 Business France 

Business organizations based in France
Organizations based in Paris
Export promotion agencies
Government agencies of France
2015 establishments in France